Perkuć Lock - tenth of the lock on the Augustów Canal (from the Biebrza). It is located near the Reserve Perkuć. Built between 1827-1828 by the Lieutenant. Julian Piędzickiego between Lake Krzywym and Lake Mikaszewo.
 Location: 63 km canal
 difference: 2.91 m
 Length: 43.5 m
 Width: 6.02 m
 Gates: Wooden
 Year built: 1827 - 1828
 Construction Manager: Julian Piędzicki

References

 
 
 

19th-century establishments in Poland
Perkuć